Shirin Guild (née Shirin Zafar; born 1946) is an Iranian-born British fashion designer. Her fashion label was established in London, in 1991. Her clothing design is minimalist and she has reworked Iranian clothing traditions through a "reductionist aesthetic". Her design work has been described as "trans-cultural".

Early life and education 
Shirin Guild was born in 1946 and grew up in Iran. Prior to the 1979 revolution, she moved to Los Angeles where she remained during the early 1980s. Her early interest with fashion came from layering with Iranian tribal apparel. Comme des Garcons and other Japanese designers of the 1970s and 1980s had an early career impact, which inspired her to start designing. 

She eventually moved to Belgravia in London. Apart from two years of tuition from the London Saint Martin's School of Art, in her youth, Shirin Guild is a self-taught fashion designer.

Career 
The Shirin Guild label was launched in 1991 by Shirin and her husband, the interior decorator Robin Guild. It is an independent company which produces three collections of womenswear a year. Most garments were manufactured entirely in Britain and the label found acclaim worldwide.

Guild's designs were originally inspired by Iranian traditional clothes shapes, with a more boxy and layered look. She had an "Abba coat" similar to a style worn by holy men in Iran and a "Kurdish"–style pant. She was initially known for oversize, square-shaped patterns, designed to take form on the feminine body, in later years, the designer's style has evolved to embrace a leaner silhouette. This has attracted younger buyers to the brand, which, in general, had previously been favored by the middle aged woman. 

Guild is renowned for utilising unconventional materials and manufacturing technologies, which she combines with traditional fabrics and craftsmanship. Guild's innovative, minimalistic garments are made of uniquely devised fabrics, based on yarns made from cashmere, silk, linen, wool, cotton, stainless steel, copper, hemp, bamboo, pineapple and even paper, or combinations thereof.

The globalization of fashion started in the 1970s, and with it saw the first emergence of fashion designers that were not of European-origins selling in Western markets. Other leading fashion designers of her generation with non-European origins include Hanae Mori, Issey Miyake, Yohji Yamamoto, Hussein Chalayan, Rifat Ozbek, Azzedine Alaia, Vivienne Tam, Eskandar, among others.

Guild's work is widely mentioned in the media, as well as in academic publications. Her creations of the label have been selected for museum collections, including at the Victoria and Albert Museum in London; and the Fashion Institute of Technology in New York City.

See also 

 List of Iranian artists

References

British fashion designers
Iranian fashion designers
British women fashion designers
Iranian women fashion designers
Artists from London
1946 births
Living people
Alumni of Central Saint Martins
Iranian emigrants to the United Kingdom